The 1997 Cronulla-Sutherland Sharks season was the 31st in the club's history and they competed in Super League's 1997 Telstra Cup premiership. Coached by John Lang and captained by Andrew Ettingshausen and Mitch Healey, they reached the Grand Final in which they were defeated by the Brisbane Broncos.

Ladder

References

Cronulla-Sutherland Sharks seasons
Cronulla-Sutherland Sharks season